This is a list of artists described as unblack metal, a genre of music which is musically and stylistically similar to black metal but whose artists profess Christianity and either promote the religion in their lyrics, oppose the Satanism and paganism promoted by black metal, or both.

Note that this list only includes bands described as unblack metal. Christian bands that are described only as black metal are not included, but can be found on the list of Christian metal artists and lists of black metal bands.

References

Bibliography

Unblack metal musical groups
Lists of black metal bands